Aku-Heikki Ilmari Hirviniemi (born 5 December 1983, in Riihimäki) is a Finnish actor.

Theatre and television

Hirviniemi has worked for several theatres around Finland, including Helsinki, Riihimäki, Jyväskylä, Lahti and Hämeenlinna, while also acting in films and on television. He first gained popularity in a television series Presidentin kanslia (2008–2011) in which he played the chauffeur Illu Airisto.

In the spring of 2010, Hirviniemi became a household name in Finland when a weekly sketch comedy television show Putous premiered. In the first season, his female character Marja Tyrni was crowned as the "sketch comedy character of the year". He was part of the cast in the first five seasons of the show, but announced on 1 March 2014 that he would not return for season six. From 2012 to 2016 Hirviniemi starred MTV3's police drama series Roba.

In 2014 Hirviniemi and another former Putous actor Jaakko Saariluoma hosted a comedy talk show Posse with The Dudesons.

Personal life

Hirviniemi has two daughters from his 18-year relationship with actress Niina Lahtinen.

Selected filmography

In films
Pohjaväri (2006)
Tali-Ihantala 1944 (2007)
The Storage (2011)
Risto (2011)
Kotirauha (2011)
Herra Heinämäki ja Leijonatuuliviiri (2011)
Härmä (2012)
21 tapaa pilata avioliitto (2013)
August Fools (2013)
Reunion (2015)
Reunion 2: The Bachelor Party (2016)
The Unknown Soldier (2017)
Reunion 3: Singles Cruise (2021)

On television
Tasavallan presidentti (2007)
Presidentin kanslia (2008–2011)
Ihmebantu (2009)
Putous (2010–2014)
Vedetään hatusta (2010)
Virta (2011)
Klikkaa mua (2011)
Roba (2012–2016)
Harjakaisen & Piisisen talkoot (2012)
Taivaan tulet (2013)
Posse (2014)
Kingi (2015)
Comedian and 7 Wonders (2015–2016)
Saturday Night Live (Finnish version) (2016)

Discography

Albums
Marja Tyrni – Tortturalli (2010)
Marja Tyrni – Joulun kulkuset (2010)
Aku Hirviniemi – Hahmo Shake (2013)

Singles
Marja Tyrni – "Suut makiaks!" (2010)
Marja Tyrni – "Eikan kulkuset" (2010)
Marja Tyrni featuring Mikko Kuustonen & Nenäpäivä Ensemble – "Leivotaan, leivotaan" (2010)
Samppa Linna – "Samppa Linna Shake" (2013)
Samppa Linna featuring Timo Jutila – "Ny rillataan viimeiseen asti" (2013)

Books
Suut makiaksi Marja Tyrnin tapaan (Helsinki-kirjat 2010)

References

External links

1983 births
Living people
People from Riihimäki
Finnish male film actors
Finnish male television actors